Glen Steven Rowe, known commonly as Steve Rowe, (born April 23, 1953) is a former Maine politician. A Democrat, he first entered politics in 1992 as a member of the Maine House of Representatives. In 1998, he became the 94th Speaker of the Maine House of Representatives, serving until he was term-limited from the House in 2000. In 2001, Rowe was elected as the 54th Maine Attorney General, serving eight years in that position.

In 2009, Rowe became Counsel at Verrill Dana, a Portland law firm. He ran unsuccessfully for the Democratic nomination for Governor of Maine in 2010. He then returned to the practice of law, but in 2012 became President of the Endowment for Health, New Hampshire's largest health foundation.  In 2015, Rowe assumed the position of President and CEO of the Maine Community Foundation.

Education
 JD, University of Maine School of Law, 1987
 MBA, University of Utah, 1978
 BS, United States Military Academy, West Point, 1975.

Professional Experience

 President and CEO, Maine Community Foundation, Present
 President, Endowment for Health, 2012-2015
 Counsel, Verrill Dana, 2009-2012
 Attorney General, State of Maine, 2001-2009
 Litigation Counsel, UNUM Provident Corporation, 1987–2000
 Manager, Fairchild Semiconductor Corporation, 1981–1984
 Officer, United States Army, 1975–1981

Political Experience
 Maine Attorney General, 2001–2009
 Representative, Maine House of Representatives, 1992–2000
 Speaker, Maine House of Representatives.

Personal
Rowe was born and raised near Gore, Oklahoma. He was married to Amanda Rowe for 32 years, until she died in 2013. He has four children and lives in Portland, Maine.

References

External links
 Project Vote Smart
 VerrillDana.com
 Rowe for Governor 

1953 births
Living people
Maine Attorneys General
Maine lawyers
Speakers of the Maine House of Representatives
Democratic Party members of the Maine House of Representatives
Politicians from Portland, Maine
University of Maine School of Law alumni
University of Utah alumni
United States Military Academy alumni
People from Gore, Oklahoma
People from Marlow, Oklahoma